You Can't Do That on Stage Anymore, Vol. 1 is a double disc live album by Frank Zappa. It was released in 1988 (see 1988 in music) under the label Rykodisc. It was the beginning of a six-volume, 12-CD set Zappa assembled of live performances throughout his career.

Shortly before the CD release, Zappa released a two-LP sampler of the series with similar artwork to the volume 1 CD.  The liner notes to the second volume included some corrections to the date information of the first volume that Zappa received from fans, and further corrections and additions have come since then using available recordings.

Track listing
All songs written by Zappa unless otherwise noted.

Personnel
Frank Zappa – engineer, keyboards, vocals, producer, main performer, guitar
Mark Volman – vocals
Howard Kaylan – vocals
Chad Wackerman – drums, vocals
Ike Willis – guitar, vocals
Lowell George – guitar, vocals
Ray White – guitar, vocals
Adrian Belew – guitar, vocals
Warren Cuccurullo – guitar, organ
Ian Underwood – wind, keyboards
Steve Vai – guitar
Dweezil Zappa – guitar
Denny Walley – slide guitar, vocals
Scott Thunes – bass guitar, synthesizer, vocals
Jim Pons – bass guitar, vocals
Roy Estrada – bass guitar, vocals
Jeff Simmons – bass guitar
Tom Fowler – bass guitar
Patrick O'Hearn – wind, bass guitar
Arthur Barrow – keyboards, bass guitar
Peter Wolf – keyboards
Allan Zavod – keyboards
Don Preston – keyboards
Ruth Underwood – vibraphone, percussion
Bobby Martin – keyboards, vocals, saxophone
Tommy Mars – keyboards, vocals
George Duke – keyboards, vocals
Motorhead Sherwood – baritone saxophone
Napoleon Murphy Brock – saxophone, vocals
Bunk Gardner – tenor saxophone, trumpet
Bruce Fowler – trombone
Vinnie Colaiuta – drums
Ralph Humphrey – drums
Art Tripp – drums
David Logerman – drums
Aynsley Dunbar – drums
Terry Bozzio – drums
Chester Thompson – drums
Jimmy Carl Black – drums, percussion
Ed Mann – percussion

References

External links
Lyrics and information
Release details

1988 live albums
Albums produced by Frank Zappa
Frank Zappa live albums
Rykodisc live albums